Sri Sivan Temple is a Hindu temple in Singapore for the god Shiva. The temple was originally located in Potong Pasir from where it was moved three more times before finally coming to the present location, adjacent to Foo Hai Ch'an Buddhist Monastery, in front of Paya Lebar MRT station exit C at Geylang East Avenue 2.

History

Former sites af Shiva Lingam at Potong Pasir, MacDonald House and Dhoby Ghaut (before 1850s)

The Sivalinga was originally present in Potong Pasir, which was then moved to a spot in the lower end of Dhoby Ghaut, then to a site near where MacDonald House stands today, and then on to the Orchard Road site where it used to be until 1983.

Former temple site at Dhoby Ghaut (1850-1983) 

Sivalinga which was earlier worshiped at Potong Pasir then moved to MacDonald House and finally to Dhoby Ghaut Green. At Dhoby Ghaut Green, an in-situ temple was built where the lingam was worshiped. This temple stayed there till 1983.

In 1898, a further phase of the recorded development of the Sri Sivan Temple began. The reconstruction work took several years to complete. One Mr V Nagappa Chetty and his wife were responsible for this, largely with their own funds and from donations collected from local Hindus.

WWII damage (1942) 
During the Second World War, some of the statues of secondary deities and a part of the temple structure were damaged by shells that landed around it. Towards the end of the war, renovations were made to the temple and a consecration ceremony was held in July 1943. In 1954, the Municipal Commissioners wanted the temple to be setback  from the road to widen Orchard Road. After long drawn discussions, a compromise was reached between the Board and the City Council. In consideration of the temple giving up  of the front land, the temple was given $50,000 and allowed to be rebuilt at the same site. Plans to rebuild the temple were drawn up in 1957. Local contractors completed the construction works in April 1962 and skilled craftsmen from India carried out the sculptural and ornamental works. The consecration ceremony was held on 9 December 1964.

Former temple site at Serangoon (1983-1993) 

In 1983, the Government decided to acquire the land on which the temple stood. An MRT station was to be built underground. Therefore, a transit temple was built next to the Sri Srinivasa Perumal Temple at Serangoon Road while a more suitable and permanent site was being identified. The temple was demolished and all its deities where temporarily shifted to a new site at Serangoon Road. All the god-forms from the Orchard Road Temple were installed in the new site at Serangoon Road which allowed for all daily prayers and festivals celebrated to be continued Temple remained at this temporary site for 10 years til 1993..

Present site at Geylang (since 1993)

On May 30 1993, the temple relocated from Seragoon Road opened at its present site in Geylang. The Hindu Endowments Board had intended to make the new temple unique in appearance, features and facilities. The Board and the management committee of the temple consulted well-known temple architects in India. The Board sent a team to study the best of both the North and South Indian Temples. What followed was a unique design with an octagonal structure with a multi-purpose hall and staff quarters. The new temple was built at a cost of $6 million on a 3,000 sq. meter plot at Geylang East. The new site is about four-and-a-half times bigger than the temple's former site at Orchard Road.

After ten years of temporary residence at Serangoon Road, the Sri Sivan Temple was consecrated at its present Geylang East site on 30 May 1993. Its 2nd consecration ceremony was held on 27 January 2008.

Management Committee

An order placing Sri Sivan Temple under the Mohammedan and Hindu Endowments Board (set up in 1907) was gazetted on 18 October 1915. In 1968, the Hindu Endowments Board (HEB) was formed to manage four temples including the Sri Sivan Temple. The Hindu Endowments Board (HEB) under the purview of the Ministry of Community Development, Youth and Sports (MCYS) manages Sri Sivan Temple.

Social activities

Several major festivals are celebrated at Sri Sivan Temple.

 Daily Pooja at 6 am, 8 am, 12 noon, 6 pm, 7 pm and 9 pm 
Maha Shivaratri
Vasantha Navratri
Guru Peyarchi
Navratri
Skantha Shasti
Prathosam - twice a month, free feast with prayers starting at 4 pm and food at 6 pm.

See also

 Context 
 1915 Singapore Mutiny
 Greater India
 History of Indian influence on Southeast Asia
 History of Singaporean Indians
 Indian diaspora
 Indianisation
 Indian National Army in Singapore
 Hinduism in South East Asia

 Indian-origin religions and people in Singapore
 Arya Samaj in Singapore
 Hinduism in Singapore
 Jainism in Singapore
 Indian Singaporeans
 List of Hindu temples in Singapore
 Lists of Hindu temples by country
 List of Indian organisations in Singapore
 Singaporean Indians

References

External links

Sri Sivan Temple website (new official website, launched on 1 June 2016)
Sri Sivan Temple on the Hindu Endowments Board website

 

 

Geylang
Hindu temples in Singapore
Indian diaspora in Singapore
Tamil Singaporean
Tourist attractions in Singapore